Raoul Thomas Reynolds Jr. (born April 11, 1949) is a former American football wide receiver in the National Football League who played for the New England Patriots and Chicago Bears. He played college football for the San Diego State Aztecs.

References

1949 births
Living people
American football wide receivers
New England Patriots players
Chicago Bears players
San Diego State Aztecs football players